Leiestes is a genus of beetles belonging to the family Endomychidae.

Species:
 Leiestes seminiger

References

Endomychidae
Coccinelloidea genera